Brooksby is a surname. Notable people with the surname include:

Angie Elizabeth Brooksby (born 1965), American painter
Eleanor Brooksby, English noblewoman
Jenson Brooksby (born 2000), American tennis player
John Burns Brooksby, Scottish veterinarian
Keegan Brooksby (born 1990), Australian rules footballer